A list of the most notable films produced in the Cinema of Romania ordered by year of release. For an A-Z list of articles on Romanian films see :Category:Romanian films.

1910s

1920s

1930s

1940s

1950s

1960s

1970s

1980s

1990s

2000s

2010s

2020s

See also 

 List of Romanian submissions for the Academy Award for Best Foreign Language Film
 List of Romanian film and theatre directors
 Cinema of Romania
 Lists of films
 List of years in Romania

External links and sources
 Romanian film at the Internet Movie Database